Ben Johnson (born July 15, 1980, in United Kingdom) is a former American football offensive tackle of the National Football League. He was drafted by the Detroit Lions in the seventh round of the 2003 NFL Draft. He played college football at Wisconsin.

Johnson was also a member of the Chicago Bears, Carolina Panthers, and San Diego Chargers.

Personal life
Johnson is a cousin of former Wisconsin teammate and NFL offensive lineman Al Johnson, who was also drafted in the 2003 NFL Draft.

External links
Detroit Lions bio

1988 births
Living people
People from Door County, Wisconsin
Players of American football from Wisconsin
American football offensive tackles
Wisconsin Badgers football players
Detroit Lions players
Chicago Bears players
Frankfurt Galaxy players
Carolina Panthers players
San Diego Chargers players